VEPP-2000 is an upgrade of the former VEPP-2M electron-positron collider (particle accelerator) at Budker Institute of Nuclear Physics (BINP) in Novosibirsk, Siberia, Russia.

References

See also
VEPP-5

Particle physics facilities
Budker Institute of Nuclear Physics